The 2014–15 UTSA Roadrunners women's basketball team represents the University of Texas at San Antonio during the 2014–15 NCAA Division I women's basketball season. The Roadrunners, led by second year head coach Lubomyr Lichonczak, play their home games at the Convocation Center and were second year members of Conference USA. They finished the season 16–15, 11–7 to finish in a three way tie for fourth place. They lost in the quarterfinals in the C-USA women's tournament to Old Dominion.

Roster

Schedule

|-
!colspan=9 style="background:#E74F00; color:#00438C;"| Regular Season

|-
!colspan=9 style="background:#E74F00; color:#00438C;"| C-USA Tournament

See also
2014–15 UTSA Roadrunners men's basketball team

References

UTSA Roadrunners women's basketball seasons
UTSA Roadrunners
UTSA Roadrunners
UTSA Roadrunners